The Europa Elite is a new British, single-engined kit aircraft design, under development in 2020 by Europa Aircraft. 

The aircraft will fit the into the EASA CS-VLA category and will be of all-composite construction, with a low-wing,  tricycle gear and two seats in side-by-side configuration. 

A stablemate of the Europa XS, the Elite features a T-tail and elliptical wings and tailplane.

Specifications

References

External links

2020s British sport aircraft
Homebuilt aircraft
Light-sport aircraft
Low-wing aircraft

Single-engined tractor aircraft